El Diario de Lima was a Spanish newspaper published from Lima, Peru. It is oldest daily newspaper published in Latin America. It was founded in 1790.

References

Publications established in 1790
Newspapers published in Peru
Spanish-language newspapers